The  Chassahowitzka National Wildlife Refuge is part of the United States National Wildlife Refuge System, located on the west coast of Florida, about  north of St. Petersburg. It is famous as the southern wintering site for the re-introduced eastern population of whooping cranes.

The Chassahowitzka National Wildlife Refuge Complex was changed to the Crystal River Complex, headquartered at Crystal River, Florida, and consists of portions of the Chassahowitzka River and Crystal River, as well as what are known as the Tampa Bay Refuges: Egmont Key, Passage Key and Pinellas.

Only a portion in the northeast is not designated as Wilderness.

In 2001, the Whooping Crane Eastern Partnership raised whooping crane (Grus americana) chicks in Wisconsin's Necedah National Wildlife Refuge then guided them to the Chassahowitzka NWR for the winter. Despite severe mortality from hurricanes in 2007, the re-introduction has been successful and by 2010 there were up to 105 migrating birds established in the eastern United States for the first time in over 100 years.

See also
 Annutteliga Hammock

References

External links
 
 Chassahowitzka National Wildlife Refuge Official site
 Chassahowitzka National Wildlife Refuge at Friends of Chassahowitzka National Wildlife Refuge Complex
  Chassahowitzka National Wildlife Refuge at Gorp.com
 Chassahowitzka National Wildlife Refuge at National Wildlife Refuge Association

Protected areas of Citrus County, Florida
Protected areas of Hernando County, Florida
IUCN Category Ib
National Wildlife Refuges in Florida
Protected areas established in 1941
1941 establishments in Florida